Henry Southern may refer to:

Henry Southern (journalist) (1799–1853), English journalist and diplomat
Henry Southern (cricketer) (1806–?), English cricketer
Henry Neville Southern (1908–1986), English ornithologist